The Medal of the Nation's Gratitude is a French state decoration established on 12 April 2002 by decree 2002-511 and awarded to civilians, veterans of civil or military service, and to members of the French armed forces previously awarded the "Title of the Nation's Gratitude", a governmental scroll certifying to honorable service abroad.

The medal was primarily established to replace the North Africa medal with broader and more inclusive prerequisites following years of pressure on the French government by veterans' organizations.

Award statute
The Medal of the Nation's Gratitude is awarded to persons who have previously been awarded the Title of the Nation's Gratitude, its particular award criteria were fixed by law No. 93-7 of 4 January 1993.   Potential recipients must meet the following conditions:
 People who, as members of the military, and for at least 90 days, consecutive or not, served in a formation of the French army or who were detached to a foreign army during the time periods and in the theatres of operation determined by the law;
 Civilians of French nationality who were involved in these conflicts, operations or missions and meeting the prerequisites set by the Minister of Defence.

The Title of the Nation's Gratitude is automatically bestowed to personnel prematurely evacuated due to injuries suffered or diseases caught while in theatre.

The list of theatres of operations determined by the laws of eligibility for the Title of the Nation's Gratitude are:
 First World War;
 Operations between 1918 and 1939;
 Second World War;
 Indochina War;
 The fighting in Tunisia between 1 January 1952 and 2 July 1962;
 The fighting in Morocco between 1 June 1953 and 2 July 1962;
 The Algerian War between 31 October 1954 and 2 July 1962;
 Military operations on the territory of Algeria between 3 July 1962 and 1 July 1964;
 Armed conflicts and operations and missions conducted in accordance with international obligations and commitments of France since 1945. The complete list is contained in the amended order of 12 January 1994.

Award description
The Medal of the Nation's Gratitude is a 34mm in diameter circular medal struck from bronze and gilded.  Its obverse bears the effigy of the Republic on surrounded by the relief inscription "RÉPUBLIQUE FRANÇAISE".  The reverse bears the relief inscription on four lines "MÉDAILLE" "DE" "RECONNAISSANCE" "DE LA NATION" over the relief image of a sprig of three oak leaves.

The medal hangs from a ribbon passing through a ring through the medal's ball shaped suspension loop. The 34mm wide sand coloured silk moiré ribbon bears inverted 34mm wide and 3mm thick blue chevrons. The undress ribbon bears three such chevrons.

The medal is always awarded with a clasp and may be awarded with multiple clasps.  Five clasps are currently approved for wear  on the ribbon of the Medal of the Nation's Gratitude:
 1914–1918
 1939–1945
 INDOCHINE
 AFRIQUE DU NORD
 OPERATIONS EXTERIEURES

Notable recipients (partial list)
General Denis Mercier
General Marcel Valentin
General Bruno Dary
Admiral Édouard Guillaud
General Philippe Houbron
General Elrick Irastorza
General Bertrand Ract-Madoux
Sergeant Gilles Mourey
French Resistance heroine Andrée Peel
French Resistance member Léopold Rabinovitch
World War 2 intelligence operative Marthe Cohn

See also

World War I
World War II
Indochina War
Algeria War
French Armed Forces

References

External links
Museum of the Legion of Honour (in French)
National Association of the bearers of the Title of the Nation's Gratitude (in French)

Civil awards and decorations of France
French campaign medals
Awards established in 2002
2002 establishments in France
History of Overseas France